Toples is a Polish disco polo musical group. The group's leader and vocalist is Marcin Siegieńczuk. The group was created in 1998.

Discography
 Przestań kłamać mała (1998)
 Ciało do ciała (1999)
 Kochaś (2000)
 Kobiety rządzą nami (2001)
 Ale szopka! (2001)
 Nie mydło, nie granat (2002)
 Gdzie strona tam żona (2003)
 1998 - 2003 (2004)
 Zostajemy do końca (2005)
 Moje piosenki - moje życie 1998 - 2008 (2008)

References

External links
Group's Official Website

1998 establishments in Poland
Polish dance music groups
Musical groups established in 1998
Polish musical groups